Iota variant, also known as lineage B.1.526, is one of the variants of SARS-CoV-2, the virus that causes COVID-19. It was first detected in New York City in November 2020. The variant has appeared with two notable mutations: the E484K spike mutation, which may help the virus evade antibodies, and the S477N mutation, which may help the virus bind more tightly to human cells.

By February 2021, it had spread rapidly in the New York region and accounted for about one in four viral sequences. By 11 April 2021, the variant had been detected in at least 48 U.S. states and 18 countries.

Under the simplified naming scheme proposed by the World Health Organization, B.1.526 has been labeled Iota variant, and is considered a variant of interest (VOI), but not yet a variant of concern.

Mutations 
The Iota (B.1.526) genome contains the following amino-acid mutations, all of which are in the virus's spike protein code: L5F, T95I, D253G, E484K, D614G and A701V.

History 
The increase of the Iota variant was captured by researchers at Caltech by scanning for mutations in a database known as GISAID, a global science initiative that has documented over 700,000 genomic sequences of SARS-CoV-2.

The proportion of USA cases represented by the Iota variant had declined sharply by the end of July 2021 as the Delta variant became dominant.

Statistics

See also  

 Variants of SARS-CoV-2: Alpha, Beta, Gamma, Delta, Epsilon, Zeta, Eta, Theta, Kappa, Lambda, Mu, Omicron

References 

S009
COVID-19 pandemic in New York City